Nora Navas García (born 24 April 1975) is a Spanish actress.

Biography 
Navas was born on 24 April 1975 in Barcelona.
She has a distinguished and prolific career, ranging from theater to film, through TV movies and series. Her performance in Black Bread (2010) earned her the Silver Shell in the San Sebastián International Film Festival, the Gaudí Award, and the Goya Award.

Filmography

TV movies 
 Trenhotel as Carmen (2007)
 Más que hermanos as Marta (2005)
 Mirage as Clare (2018)

Television series
 El Cor de la Ciutat as Anna (2006–2007)
 Jet lag (2006)
 Porca Misèria as Marta (2005–2006)
 Ventdelplà as Laura (2005)
 Pagats per riure (2001)
 Crims (2000)
 Programa más o menos multiplicado o dividido (1996)

Theatre
 Assaigs oberts: A partir de la màquina Hamlet, Heiner Müller (2003)
 Fuera de cuadro (2003)
 4d òptic (2003)
 Les tres germanes as Irina (2004) (Three sisters)
 Calígula as Mucius' wife (2004)
 Tennessee (2006)
 La fam (2006)
 La casa de Bernarda Alba (2009)

Awards 
 2010: Silver Shell for the best actress - Black Bread
 2011: Gaudí award for the best actress - Black Bread
 2011: Goya Award for Best Actress - Black Bread

References

External links

1975 births
Living people
Actresses from Barcelona
Stage actresses from Catalonia
Film actresses from Catalonia
21st-century Spanish actresses
Television actresses from Catalonia